Raveendran was an Indian music director. Raveendran or Ravindran may also refer to:
 Raveendran, Malayalam film music director
 P. Ravindran, Ex-Minister of Labour, Kerala
 Ravindran (actor), Indian film actor
 Ravindran Kannan, Indian computer scientist
 K. Ravindran, Malaysian footballer currently playing for Sarawak FA in Malaysia Super League